New Mind is a single by the New York City band Swans. The title track appears in a one-minute-longer version on the band's next studio album, Children of God. "Damn You to Hell" and "I'll Swallow You" are included simply as "I'll Swallow You" on the CD re-release Children of God/World of Skin, but not on the initial release.

Track listing

Musicians

Michael Gira – vocals, sounds, keyboards, acoustic guitar
Norman Westberg – electric / acoustic guitar 
Jarboe – vocals, all female background vocals, sounds, piano
Algis Kizys – bass
Ted Parsons – drums, percussion

Charts

References

External links
 Swans official website - New Mind EP

1987 songs
1987 singles
Swans (band) songs